The 1963 Texas Western Miners football team was an American football team that represented Texas Western College (now University of Texas at El Paso) as an independent during the 1963 NCAA University Division football season. In its first season under head coach Warren Harper, the team played home games on campus at the new Sun Bowl stadium, compiled a 3–7 record, and was outscored 142 to 98.

Schedule

References

Texas Western
UTEP Miners football seasons
Texas Western Miners football